The Regional Council of Veneto (Consiglio Regionale del Veneto) is the regional parliament of Veneto.

The council, which has its seat at Palazzo Ferro Fini, located along the Grand Canal in Venice. was first elected in 1970, when ordinary regions were established, twenty-two years after the Italian Constitution envisioned them in 1948.

Composition
The Regional Council of Veneto (Consiglio Regionale del Veneto) is composed of 51 members. 49 councillors are elected in provincial constituencies by proportional representation using the largest remainder method with a Droop quota and open lists, while the remaining two are the elected President and the candidate for president who comes second. The winning coalition wins a bonus of seats in order to make sure the elected president has a majority in the council.

The council is elected for a five-year term, but, if the President suffers a vote of no confidence, resigns or dies, under the simul stabunt, simul cadent (literally they will stand together or they will fall together) clause introduced in the Italian Constitution in 1999 and later incorporate in the Statute of Veneto, also the council is dissolved and an early election is called.

The current President of the council is Roberto Ciambetti of the Venetian League.

Current composition

The Regional Council of Veneto is currently composed of the following political groups:

Presidents

See also
Members of the Regional Council of Veneto, 2020–2025
Members of the Regional Council of Veneto, 2015–2020
Members of the Regional Council of Veneto, 2010–2015
Members of the Regional Council of Veneto, 2005–2010
Regional council (Italy)
Government of Veneto
Politics of Veneto

References

External links
Regional Council of Veneto

Politics of Veneto
Italian Regional Councils
Vento